The 1906 World Allround Speed Skating Championships took place at 24 and 25 January 1906 at the ice rink Pohjoissatama in Helsinki, Finland.

Coen de Koning was defending champion. He did not participated and did not defend his title.

There was no World champion declared, no one won three of the four distances.

Allround results 

  * = Fell
 NC = Not classified
 NF = Not finished
 NS = Not started
 DQ = Disqualified
Source: SpeedSkatingStats.com

Rules 
Four distances have to be skated:
 500m
 1500m
 5000m
 10000m

One could only win the World Championships by winning at least three of the four distances, so there would be no World Champion if no skater won at least three distances.

Silver and bronze medals were not awarded.

References 

World Allround Speed Skating Championships, 1906
1906 World Allround
World Allround, 1906
International sports competitions in Helsinki
1906 in Finnish sport
January 1906 sports events
1900s in Helsinki